Rikhak-e Sofla (also Romanized as Rīkhak-e Soflá; also known as Haft Sahmī) is a village in Howmeh-ye Sarpol Rural District, in the Central District of Sarpol-e Zahab County, Kermanshah Province, Iran. At the 2006 census, its population was 92, in 23 families.

References 

Populated places in Sarpol-e Zahab County